Briaraula is a genus of moths, belonging to the family Tineidae.

References

Tineidae
Tineidae genera